The Stillwater Covered Bridge No. 134 is a historic wooden covered bridge located at Stillwater in Columbia County, Pennsylvania. It crosses the Big Fishing Creek. It is one of 28 historic covered bridges in Columbia and Montour Counties.

It was listed on the National Register of Historic Places in 1979.

Gallery

References 

Covered bridges on the National Register of Historic Places in Pennsylvania
Covered bridges in Columbia County, Pennsylvania
Bridges completed in 1849
Wooden bridges in Pennsylvania
Bridges in Columbia County, Pennsylvania
1849 establishments in Pennsylvania
National Register of Historic Places in Columbia County, Pennsylvania
Road bridges on the National Register of Historic Places in Pennsylvania
Burr Truss bridges in the United States